Jørgen Skjelvik (born 5 July 1991) is a Norwegian professional footballer who plays for Odense as a left back. After starting his career with the local club Stabæk, Skjelvik moved to Sweden where he played in Allsvenskan with Helsingborg and Kalmar, before he returned to Norway and joined Rosenborg in July 2013. He has represented Norway from under-18 to under-21 level, but was left out of the Norwegian squad for the 2013 UEFA European Under-21 Football Championship due to an injury.

Career
Hailing from Hosle in Bærum, Skjelvik played for Stabæk's youth team that won the Norwegian Youth Cup in 2008. He was drafted into the first team in April 2009. He made his first-team debut in the Norwegian football cup, in May 2009 against Sander IL. He had one assist in the game. His league debut came one week later.

On 2 August 2011, it became official that Swedish club Helsingborgs IF would take him in on a loan for the rest of the season. Skjelvik made his debut on 13 August, coming on as a substitution in the 77th minute and also managed to score a goal in the 3–1 win against local rivals Trelleborgs FF. After winning both the Allsvenskan and the Svenska Cupen with Helsingborg in 2011, Skjelvik moved to Kalmar FF ahead of the 2012 season and signed a three-year contract with the club.

Skjelvik played regularly for Kalmar during the 2012 season, and scored two goals and made nine assists. He was injured during the 2013 season, and did only play a few minutes as a substitute. In July 2013 he signed a 4.5-year contract with Norwegian team Rosenborg.

In November 2017, Skjelvik decided not to extend his contract with Rosenborg and would leave as a free agent at the end of the 2017 season.

On 15 December 2017, it was announced he would be joining LA Galaxy in MLS on a free transfer. On the transfer deadline day, 31 January 2020, he was loaned out to Danish Superliga club Odense Boldklub until the end of 2020. On January 7, 2021, Skjelvik signed a permanent deal with Danish club Odense, which will keep him with the club through 2023.

International career
Skjelvik was first capped for Norway when he played for the under-18 team in 2009. He has later represented Norway at under-19 and under-21 level. He was regularly in the under-21 team's squad, and played the friendly matches against Russia U-21 and Spain U-21 ahead of the 2013 UEFA European Under-21 Football Championship, but was left out of the squad due to an injury. On 15 November 2013, he made his debut for Norway  against Denmark.

Career statistics

Club

Honours

Club
Rosenborg
Norwegian League (3): 2015, 2016, 2017
Norwegian Football Cup (2): 2015, 2016

References

External links
 
 

1991 births
Living people
Sportspeople from Bærum
Association football defenders
Norwegian footballers
Norwegian expatriate footballers
Norway international footballers
Norway under-21 international footballers
Norway youth international footballers
Stabæk Fotball players
Helsingborgs IF players
Kalmar FF players
Rosenborg BK players
LA Galaxy players
Odense Boldklub players
Eliteserien players
Allsvenskan players
Major League Soccer players
Danish Superliga players
Norwegian expatriate sportspeople in the United States
Norwegian expatriate sportspeople in Sweden
Norwegian expatriate sportspeople in Denmark
Expatriate soccer players in the United States
Expatriate footballers in Sweden
Expatriate men's footballers in Denmark